Kale Peuke ('Beautiful Pine') was a town located in the ancient Troad mentioned by Strabo. 

Its site is located north of Gürgen Dağ in Asiatic Turkey.

References

Populated places in ancient Troad
Former populated places in Turkey